The Homestretch is a 1947 American drama film directed by H. Bruce Humberstone and written by Wanda Tuchock. The film stars Cornel Wilde, Maureen O'Hara, Glenn Langan, Helen Walker, James Gleason, Henry Stephenson and Margaret Bannerman. The film was released on May 4, 1947, by 20th Century Fox.

Plot
Jock Wallace and Kitty Brant are rival thoroughbred horse breeders. He outbids her for a promising but injured horse, Abby R, paying $500 for it, angering the owner's niece, Leslie Hale, who feels the horse is worth much more.

Jock is attracted to Leslie and invites her to the Kentucky Derby to see another of his horses run. She is involved with a diplomat, Bill Van Dyke, and plans to join him in England for the coronation of King George VI, so Jock decides to pursue her there and enter his horse in the Ascot Gold Cup instead.

On a boat to Argentina, where he intends to race Abby R next, Jock charms Leslie and they are married. But the return of Kitty, combined with Jock's broken promises and racing debts, leads to the pregnant Leslie having a miscarriage and leaving him. Valiant, a horse Jock gave her as a gift, begins winning big races at Saratoga, Belmont, Hollywood Park and other major tracks. Jock gets a gift horse from Kitty and decides to run it against Valiant in the Kentucky Derby. Leslie's horse wins by a nose, but Jock wins back her love.

Cast 
Cornel Wilde as Jock Wallace
Maureen O'Hara as Leslie Hale
Glenn Langan as Bill Van Dyke III
Helen Walker as Kitty Brant
James Gleason as Doc Kilborne
Henry Stephenson as Don Humberto Balcares
Margaret Bannerman as Ellamae Scott
Ethel Griffies as Aunt Martha
Tommy Cook as Pablo Artigo

References

External links 
 

1947 films
20th Century Fox films
American drama films
1947 drama films
Films directed by H. Bruce Humberstone
Films scored by David Raksin
Films with screenplays by Wanda Tuchock
1940s English-language films
1940s American films